Bellcaire d'Empordà is a municipality in the comarca of Baix Empordà, in Catalonia, Spain.

References

External links
 Government data pages 

Municipalities in Baix Empordà
Populated places in Baix Empordà